Can't Knock the Hustle may refer to:
"Can't Knock the Hustle" (Jay-Z song), 1996
"Can't Knock the Hustle" (Weezer song), 2018